Overton Grange School is a mixed academy school in Sutton, Greater London, England. The school opened in 1997 with its first intake.

Planning for a new school in the area was identified in the 1980s. The capacity is approximately 1300 students. It has a sixth form college, opened in 2002.

It has a hearing support department and a greater number of students with disabilities because of the purpose-built facilities.

The school became an academy on 1 June 2011.

Students are divided into two bands - Overton and Grange - dividing between Grange learning Spanish language and Overton learning French language. 

Overton Grange School, or 'Overton' as it is more commonly known as, has four house groups: Amber, Emerald, Ruby and Sapphire.  

Each form, or tutor group, has between 25-30 students, all in one house and all in one band.  

The latest OFSTED report, following its January 2016 inspection, grades the school as "Good" in all categories. The report notes that "a culture exists whereby everyone ‘takes ownership of pupils’. Consequently, leaders have addressed well the areas for improvement since the last inspection". It has also been Inspected again in March 2019. Again it was graded "Good".

The School provides 7 Years of Education for all students. Year 12 and 13 are the Sixth form. In order for a student to move into the sixth form, they require sufficient GCSE results from the Year 11 Exams at the end of the year. If they have not achieved these grades, then it will require them to search for another Sixth form for further education.

Background
The school was built on derelict land which once housed a blood transfusion centre and then a youth theatre workshop. The site had originally seen planning for a new prison. The first intake was in September 1997 but it was not until 27 March 1998 that the school was officially opened. Further accommodation was added to support GCSE students in September 2000 and a sixth form was built in September 2002.

List of Headteachers
Mr. Kieran Osborne (1997–2004)
Mr Gerry Bennett (2004)
Mr. Willis (2004–2005)
Mr. Jones (2005–2006) (Interim)
Mr. Stephen Foxwell (2006–2008)
Mr Gerry Bennett and Mr Keith Stride (2009)
Mr. Peter Butterworth (2009–2016)
Mr. Gerry Bennett and Mr. Keith Stride (2016–2019)
Mr. Keith Stride (2019–2022)
Mr. Eccles and Miss Auger (2022-present)

Notes

External links

 gov.uk School Search

Official website

Academies in the London Borough of Sutton
Educational institutions established in 1997
International Baccalaureate schools in England
Secondary schools in the London Borough of Sutton
1997 establishments in England